The Icelandic Skating Association (ÍSS) is the national association for figure skating in Iceland.

The ÍSS has its origins in the Icelandic Skating Association which was formed in 1995 as an umbrella association for both figure skating and Ice hockey. In 2004, it was divided into Skautasamband Ísland for figure skating and Íshokkísamband Íslands for Ice hockey.
The Icelandic Skating Association is a member federation of the International Skating Union. The association's headquarters are currently in Reykjavik.

Former presidents
This is a list of former presidents is from Icelandic Skating Association

Presidents of the joint Figure Skating and Ice Hockey Association active 1995-2004:
1995 - 1996 Hannes Sigurjónsson
1996 - 1997 Marjo Kristinsson
1997 - 2004 Elísabet Eyjólfsdóttir

Presidents of Icelandic Figure Skating Association 2004-present:
2004 - 2007 Elísabet Eyjólfsdóttir
2007 - 2012 June Eva Clark 
2012 - 2014 Björgvin Ingvar Ormarsson 
2014 - 2016 Margrét Jamchi Ólafsdóttir
2016 - 2020 Guðbjört Erlendsdóttir
2020 - present     Svava Hróðný Jónsdóttir

See also
 Icelandic Figure Skating Championships

References

External links
 Official homepage of the Icelandic Skating Association

Iceland
Figure skating
Figure skating in Iceland
Sports organizations established in 1995